Scolopia crenata, known commonly  as potato plum of Mysore, is a subcanopy tree found in tropical evergreen to semi-evergreen forests of Indo-Malaysia and the Western Ghats, up to 1800 m.

References

External links
 Details
 http://www.ebotany.org/4DCGI/Detail:5:248970:0

crenata